Kinkin may refer to:

Za dynasty#Rulers of the Za dynasty as given in the Tarikh al-Sudan
Tillandsia 'Kinkin'